Golam Kabud-e Sofla or Galam Kabud-e Sofla may refer to:
 Golam Kabud-e Sofla, Kermanshah
 Galam Kabud-e Sofla, Sarpol-e Zahab, Kermanshah Province